Coláiste Pobail Acla is a secondary school located in Currane Peninsula, in the West of Ireland (Connacht), near Achill Island. The school was formed when Scoil Damhnait (founded by Padraig Sweeney in the 1940s), a secondary school on the Currane Peninsula in the village of Pollranny, was amalgamated with McHale College in 2011, forming Coláiste Pobail Acla.

References

External links
Coláiste Pobail Acla official school website

Secondary schools in County Mayo
Educational institutions established in 2011
2011 establishments in Ireland